The 2012 Fifth Third Bank Tennis Championships women's singles was a professional tennis tournament played on outdoor hard courts in Lexington, Kentucky, United States.

Chichi Scholl was the defending champion, but lost in the first round to Bethanie Mattek-Sands.

Julia Glushko won the title, defeating Johanna Konta in the final, 6–3, 6–0.

Seeds

Draw

Finals

Top half

Bottom half

References 
 Main draw
 Qualifying draw

Fifth Third Bank Tennis Championships - Singles
2012 WS